Express or EXPRESS may refer to:

Arts, entertainment, and media

Films
 Express: Aisle to Glory, a 1998 comedy short film featuring Kal Penn
 The Express: The Ernie Davis Story, a 2008 film starring Dennis Quaid
 The Express (2022 film), a Russian tragicomedy film

Music
 Express (album), by Love and Rockets, 1986
 "Express" (Christina Aguilera song), 2010
 "Express" (Dina Carroll song), a song by Dina Carroll from the 1993 album So Close
 "Express" (B. T. Express song), 1975

Periodicals
 Express (Cologne newspaper), a daily tabloid newspaper in Germany
 Express (Washington, D.C. newspaper), a defunct free daily in Washington, D.C., U.S.
 Express, a daily financial newspaper in Greece
 Express, a city supplement published by The New Indian Express newspaper
 Daily Express (Urdu newspaper), an Urdu-language Pakistani newspaper
 Daily Express, a British newspaper
 Gazeta Express, a newspaper in Pristina, Kosovo
 L'Express, a French magazine
Los Angeles Express (newspaper), a daily newspaper in Los Angeles
 Shepherd Express, an alternative weekly in Wisconsin
The Express (Adelaide), a former evening newspaper in Adelaide, South Australia
The Express (Granville newspaper), a former community newspaper published in Granville, New South Wales
The Express (Illinois newspaper), a weekly newspaper published in the village of Tallula, Menard County, Illinois
The Express and Telegraph, a former evening newspaper in Adelaide, South Australia
Express News (Pakistan), media in Pakistan.

Brands and enterprises
 American Express, an American multinational financial services corporation
 Chevrolet Express, a full-size van
 Express, Inc., an American specialty fashion retailer
 Express Werke, a German bicycle and motorcycle manufacturer
 Honda Express, a moped
 Renault Express, a van
 Talbot Express, a van

Computing
 EXPRESS (data modeling language)
 Express.js, a web framework written for Node.js
 ExpressCard, a new interface standard for notebook external cards, replacing PCMCIA
 Outlook Express, a Microsoft email and news client

Mail and transportation
 C&C 110 Express, an American sailboat design
 Express bus service, a fast bus service, usually with a limited number of stops
 ExpressJet, an American airline
 ExPRESS Logistics Carrier, an International Space Station payloads program
 Express mail, a postal delivery service
 DHL Express
 Federal Express, also known as "FedEx"
 UPS express critical
USPS Priority Mail Express
 Express train, a fast train service, usually with a limited number of stops
 Express trains in India
 Pony Express
 York Factory Express – also known as "the Express", "the Columbia Express", and "the Communication" – was a 19th-century transport brigade operated by the Hudson's Bay Company (HBC)
 Volvo Express, high roof estate version of the Volvo Duett
Samjhauta Express, a train transportation network  between Pakistan and India

Science
 Express (satellite), a series of Russian communications satellites
 EXPRES, an optical fiber spectrograph and telescope instrument

Sports teams
 Air21 Express, a Philippine basketball team now called Barako Bull Energy
 Chicago Express, an ECHL hockey team from 2011–12
 Los Angeles Express (USFL), a team in the United States Football League
 Memphis Express, a team in the Alliance of American Football
 Ra'anana Express, an Israeli baseball team
 Round Rock Express, a Class AAA baseball team in Round Rock, Texas, U.S.
 Express FC, Ugandan association football club

Other uses
 Express (weaponry), a category of high-velocity rifles and ammunition
 Gene expression, the process by which information from a gene is used in the synthesis of a functional gene product

See also
 Espresso, a coffee beverage
 Expression (disambiguation)
 Expressway (disambiguation)
 Ekspress (disambiguation)
 L'Express (disambiguation)
 Xpress (disambiguation)